Mount McClintock is the highest mountain in the Britannia Range in Antarctica, surmounting the south end of Forbes Ridge,  east of Mount Olympus. It was discovered by the Discovery expedition (1901–04) and named for Admiral Sir Leopold McClintock, Royal Navy, a member of the Ship Committee for the expedition.

It is claimed by Australia as part of the Australian Antarctic Territory.  It is also higher than all peaks of Australia, including all external territories.

See also
 List of Ultras of Antarctica

References

Sources
 

Mountains of Oates Land
Britannia Range (Antarctica)